Sir Robert Alexander Osborne Dalyell of the Binns, 8th Baronet DL JP (1821 – 1886) was a British diplomat, and one of the Dalyell baronets.  In some sources, his middle name is spelled Osborn.

He received an M.A. in 1847 from Trinity College, Cambridge.  He studied law at the Inner Temple and was called to the bar in 1849.  He was a J.P. and D.L. of Linlithgowshire.

In his diplomatic career, he was acting consul-general in Bucharest 1856–7, and in Belgrade 1857–9.  He was consul in Erzerum, Turkey 1859–62, in Iași, Romania 1862–1865, and in Ruse, Bulgaria 1865–74.

He died unmarried and the baronetcy became dormant until 1914.

He is buried in Abercorn churchyard in West Lothian. The grave lies to the south-east next to the southern path.

References

External links
 
 Sir Robert Alexander Osborne Dalyell of the Binns, 8th Bt. (thePeerage.com)

1821 births
1886 deaths
British diplomats
Alumni of Trinity College, Cambridge
Members of the Inner Temple
Place of birth missing
Baronets in the Baronetage of Nova Scotia